Signal peptide, CUB domain and EGF like domain containing 1 is a protein that in humans is encoded by the SCUBE1 gene.

Function

This gene encodes a cell surface glycoprotein that is a member of the SCUBE (signal peptide, CUB domain, EGF (epidermal growth factor)-like protein) family. Family members have an amino-terminal signal peptide, nine copies of EGF-like repeats and a CUB domain at the carboxyl terminus. This protein is expressed in platelets and endothelial cells and may play an important role in vascular biology.

References

Further reading